Gestel may refer to several places:

 Gestel, Netherlands, a former village near Eindhoven
 Gestel en Blaarthem, a former municipality near Eindhoven, now a neighbourhood of that city
 , in Berlaar Antwerp, Belgium
 Gestel, Meerhout, Meerhout Antwerp, Belgium
 Gestel, Lummen, Lummen Limburg, Belgium
 Gestel, Meeuwen, Meeuwen Limburg, Belgium
 Gestel, Morbihan, Morbihan France